The Hebrew Roots movement is a  religious movement that advocates adherence to the Torah and believes in Yeshua as the Messiah.

History
Since the early 20th century, different religious organizations have been teaching a belief in Jesus (called Yeshua by adherents) as mankind's redeemer and savior from man's own sinful nature and a lifestyle in keeping with the Torah, the Sabbath and the annual Feasts (or mo'adim, Holy Days). These include Messianic Judaism (to a very limited degree) in 1916, the Sacred Name Movement (SNM) in 1937, and the Worldwide Church of God (WCG) in the 1930s, and, later, the Hebrew Roots Movement. Thus far, the WCG has had the greatest impact on all organizations which teach these beliefs, including obedience to much of the Old Testament law, both nationally and internationally until about 1994–95. Within a few years after the death of its founder, Herbert W Armstrong, in 1986, the succeeding church administration modified the denomination's doctrines and teachings in order to be compatible with mainstream evangelical Christianity, while many members and ministers left and formed other churches that conformed to many, but, not all, of Armstrong's teachings. Consequently, the WCG spawned numerous splinter groups, with most of these new churches adopting names bearing the term "Church of God" (COG) and retaining the belief system developed by Armstrong.

In contrast, Hebrew Roots (or sometimes, Hebraic Roots) is a grassroots movement without an ecclesiastical superstructure and it does not adhere to the COG belief system, nor does it adhere to Messianic Judaism, or to the SNM, although there are commonalities. A number of its founders began teaching about the need to keep the 7th Day Sabbath, to observe annual Feasts, and to obey Old Testament commandments years before these topics were taught and accepted by some in the Christian churches. These early teachers include William Dankenbring (1964) and Dean Wheelock (1981) (both of whom had prior associations with different Churches of God), Joe Good (1978), and Brad Scott (1983). Batya Wootten's curiosity about the Gentile majority in many Messianic Jewish congregations resulted in her first book about the two houses of Israel in 1988. This was later followed by her 1998 book entitled Who is Israel (now renamed in its 4th edition as Redeemed Israel).

In 1994, Dean and Susan Wheelock received their federal trademark for the term "Hebrew Roots", after which they began publishing the Hebrew Roots magazine in April/May 1998, and later a website at Hebrewroots.net. The goal of this group is "Exploring the Hebrew Roots of the Faith Once Delivered", "roots" which go back to not only Yeshua and the Talmidim (Disciples), but to the Nazarenes of the first century and, ultimately, the original Hebrews (Ivrim), Abraham and his offspring, who were the first to "cross over" (which is one view of what "Hebrew" means in the Hebrew language). Those who continue in this Hebraic walk seek out the history, culture, and faith of the first century believers who, like Abraham and Moses obeyed God's voice, charge, commandments, statutes, and laws (Gen 26:5). The 41,000 denominations of Christianity commonly believe that such obedience (viz, to the 613 Torah commands) is no longer required. This is largely due to a number of statements by Paul the Apostle.

The Hebrew Roots movement began emerging as a distinct phenomenon in the mid-1990s (1993–96). In 1997, Dean Cozzens of Open Church Ministries (Colorado Springs, CO) published "The Hebrew Movement", claiming that God had foreordained four major moves for the 20th century, Pentecostalism, faith healing, the Charismatic movement and finally the Hebrew Roots movement, the "final stage of empowerment" before Christ returns. Several Hebrew Roots ministries are now preferring to use the term Awakening instead of the term "movement" which has been used widely since the 1960s to define politically oriented movements.

The movement has accelerated in the last few years, mainly because of a shift within the Messianic Jewish community. The Hebrew Roots movement and a few Messianic Jewish groups diverge on the issue of One Law theology (one law for the native born and the sojourner, c.f. Numbers 15:16) which Hebrew Roots subscribes to, but which some Messianic Jewish groups deny. One Hebrew Roots teacher, Tim Hegg, responded to this issue by defending what he believes to be the biblical teaching of One Torah theology and its implications concerning the obligations of Torah obedience for new Messianic believers from the nations. The Two-House and One Law differences have affected musicians who are welcomed by Hebrew Roots fellowships notwithstanding their beliefs: "...many Messianic Jewish artists who are heavily influenced by organizations like the MJAA and the UMJC have been told by their leadership that if they ever appear at an MIA event they will not be able to play with them again".

Beliefs
 The books of both the Old and New Testaments are held as holy books. The Torah serves as the foundation to all subsequent understanding and interpretation of scripture. A foundational distinction of the Hebrew Roots movement is the manner in which scripture is translated and interpreted so that the latter scriptures, particularly the New Testament (usually called by adherents the "Brit Chadashah", a modern Hebrew usage to refer to these scriptures, or "Apostolic Scriptures"), do not conflict with Torah commandments. Those in the Hebrew Roots movement believe that Yeshua the Messiah did not come to establish a new religion or to do away with the Law of Moses, as Yeshua states in Matt. 5:17, but to clarify that the Jewish Oral Law was not of divine origin. An example of such is at Mark 7:1-13.
 Salvation derives from the belief in Yeshua the Messiah as personal savior, not from commandment/Torah keeping. Hebrew Roots followers believe that sin is breaking the Torah (cf. 1 John 3:4), all of the purity laws such as dietary restrictions and sabbath keeping are in the Torah, thus it is sinful to not keep the sabbath and to eat forbidden animals, among other social and religious observance laws. They believe that the ability to obey God’s laws is an effect of God’s Grace and outpouring of the Holy Spirit onto His people. People would not be able to keep the laws absent of God’s holiness, which shows why humans are sinners in need of a Savior. Yeshua said he did not come to change the law, but to fulfill it (Matthew 5:17). This means that prior to Yeshua, Israel was attempting to obey the Lord out of their own strength. 50 days after Yeshua rose was the first outpouring of the Holy Spirit (Pentecost). Once people had access to the Spirit and God’s Grace, obeying God’s law went from impossible to possible.   
 The Jewish Oral Law (the Talmud) does not represent Scriptural requirements to be obeyed, but can provide deeper understanding as to how some have applied the scriptures to practical life. Traditions considered to have Pagan origins, such as Christmas, adopted by Judaism and/or Christianity are to be avoided.
 Old Testament/Torah Laws and the teachings of the New Testament are to be obeyed by both Jews and Gentiles in the community of believers. (See Numbers 15:15–16 for the explanation).
 The Hebrew language is generally studied because it amplifies an understanding of the Scriptural text.
 Unlike most Americans, followers of the Hebrew Roots movement actively study the scriptures as well as the history, faith, and culture of the first and second century, to understand how traditional Christianity diverged from its Hebrew roots. 
 The mo'adim or appointed times listed in Leviticus 23, including the 7th day Sabbath and the Feast days, foreshadow the 1st and 2nd comings of the Messiah and the Creator's plan of salvation for the world.

Jewish feasts
Hanukkah and Purim can be recognized as being more of a national holiday (such as the American 4 July Independence Day) and are generally explained in-season. They may or may not be observed since they are not commanded in the Torah.

The Feasts of YHWH (Lev 23:2)
Hebrew Roots adherents teach that the seven Torah annual Sabbath Holy Days (sometimes called High Sabbaths) reveal the Messiah Jesus Christ and his plan of salvation. "In the festivals, God explains, defines, demonstrates and reinforces Himself and His plan". They believe that the feasts were ordained at creation (Gen. 1:14—seasons = mo'adim in Hebrew (mow-ah-deem'--which is the plural of the singular [mo'ed]): appointed times or rehearsals), and are YHWH's (Yahwehs) feasts—not Jewish or Israeli holidays or "our" feasts (Lev 23). They also abide by the instructions given in Lev. 18:1–3; and Lev. 20:23 prohibiting pagan customs (e.g. Christmas and Easter). 
 
The feasts in Hebrew are termed chag, which comes from the Hebrew root word chagag, meaning "to move in a circle, to march in a sacred procession, to celebrate or dance." Although it is commonly stated there are seven feasts, it is perhaps more precise to state that there are seven appointed times which include the three feasts (chagim). The weekly 7th day Sabbath is also considered an appointment.

Scripture indicates that these chags are to be observed at the Temple in Jerusalem, which is not possible today. In a more profound fulfillment, however, believers have now become the spiritual temple in which the Holy Spirit (Ruach HaKodesh) dwells and His name is now placed within the believer to determine the place of observance (e.g. Rev 22:4). Believers rejoice and rehearse the meaning of these days when they gather to meet.

The two seasons (Spring and Fall) of the appointments and their feasts form both a history and a prophetic picture of things to come (Col 2:16–17; Heb 10:1). They portray the two comings of Jesus Christ, in as much as the two daily Temple sacrifices are also types. In the first century the Jewish people debated whether there would be two comings (the Suffering Servant or the Conquering King) of the Messiah which precipitated John the Baptist's question (Matt 11:3).

1 & 2. Feast of Unleavened Bread (Passover) | Chag haMatzot (Chag haPesach)

Unleavened Bread is a seven-day firstfruits of barley harvest festival where unleavened bread is to be eaten during this time. Believers dispose of all yeast laden bread products (it is not called the feast of unleavened beer). Yeast is a fungal spore which is present in the air and can infiltrate bread dough and make it rise through the process of fermentation—not by induced chemical reaction (e.g. baking soda). Symbolically, unleavened bread contains no yeast. Leaven is a symbol of false doctrine (sin) that is spread through the air and of which believers must be aware (Matt 16:6–12).

Historically, this festival has been commonly called the Feast of Passover and the festival separated into two festivals by some Messianics: Passover and Unleavened Bread since there is a Sabbath (mo'ed=appointment) on the first and last days of the Feast. Over the centuries the term Passover in the Gospel accounts has become somewhat clouded: e.g. Did the term begin the season on Nisan 10 when the lambs were chosen? Did it only refer to Nisan 14? Or did it refer to the entire seven day festival? One might see a similar situation with Christmas and the Christmas season.

There is no record of the Jewish people changing their observance of the Passover date. Both John 4:6 and 19:14 are offered as evidence that the traditional observance of the Lord's Supper (also called the "Christian Passover") was not held the night before the Jewish Passover. John was a Jew and, therefore, used Jewish time of day in both verses. Christ's placement on the cross at 9 AM and death at 3 PM fulfills the dual typology of temple sacrifices, the slaying of the Passover lambs at 3 PM, and the setting of the Sun (according to Jewish culture began at the noon hour— i.e. “between the evenings”). (See Quartodecimanism and Passover (Christian holiday). Consequently, some Hebrew Roots adherents follow the Jewish time of observance, not the Roman time, and are aware that a Passover meal is not plausible where leavened bread is used in a meal as a "sop" (John 13:26–30) along with other timing inconsistencies with Roman time such as John 13:1 and 18:28. Others in the movement may still observe the traditional Last Supper Passover the night before. and offer the similar Gospel accounts of Mark 14:12–26; Matt 26:17–30; and Luke 22:70 as evidence to the contrary. Although the issue is more complex than this quite brief summary, the observing of either of the two different times, whichever one chooses, thus far, has not been a serious dividing issue in the movement. The Jewish Seder may or may not be followed as a general outline, but the inclusion of the Messiah's life and events into the evening's observance is always addressed.

Meaning: The festival is rich in many meanings as traditionally taught and for the Torah pursuant Hebrew Roots believer in Christ.

3. Feast of Weeks (Pentecost) | Chag Shavuot

Pentecost is a Greek word meaning “fiftieth (day)”. Shavuot (Shah-voo-oat') is the Hebrew word. The day is also called by other names, such as the Feast of Harvest (Ex. 23:16), Feast of Weeks (Ex. 34:22), and Day of Firstfruits (Num. 28:26). The main Shavuot ritual involved the "new meal-offering" which was the main ritual of that day and consisted of two loaves of leavened bread. Scripture does not directly reveal the meaning of the two loaves and various conjectures have been made: e.g. the two Houses of Israel, Israelites and Gentiles, etc. Many begin the count to Pentecost on the first weekly Sabbath following the Passover day, while others begin the count on Nisan 15 following the Jewish tradition and interpretation of which constitutes a "sabbath". This difference in counting is not a dividing issue. People observe either the one day or the other according to their conscience and knowledge of scripture and still gather to meet on the weekly Sabbath and other annual Sabbath days.

Meaning: The day pictures the firstfruits of the wheat harvest, the Holy Spirit given to the Apostles, and a type of Jubilee (biblical) since it occurs 50 days after the Wave Sheaf Offering during the Feast of Unleavened Bread. The meaning of the day has also been compared to the Bride of Christ: “It signifies the completion of the cleansing and preparation of the Bride of Messiah (that's us!) for her wedding day.” Jewish tradition indicates that the Torah was given on Shavuot. It was the acceptance of Torah which bound ancient Israel to God in a marriage contract. “All ancient Israelite marriages required a marriage contract, or covenant document, called a Ketubah (Keh-too'-bah). The Torah constitutes the Ketubah between God and the children of Israel. The bride was required to accept the terms of the Ketubah (a kind of covenant) so they could be fully married. Israel, as the bride, did this when she said:"... 'All that the LORD [YHWH] has spoken we will do.'" (Ex. 19:8). Shavuot has also been linked as a type of “Eighth Day” to the Feast of Unleavened Bread.

4. Trumpets | Yom Teruah (Rosh HaShanah)

Jews call this day Rosh Hashanah—but it is not termed so in scripture where it is commanded to be kept. Instead it is found in Ezk. 29:17 and 45:18. The Hebrew word for trumpets is also not used where the command to be blown is found in Lev 23:24. An exact translation of the term would be 'Feast of Clamor' or 'Feast of Acclamation' or, the 'Day of Blowing'—as the Jews sometime name it.  Instead, the day is most commonly known as Yom Teruah  (Yohm Teh-roo-ah') and is translated into English as 'Feast of Trumpets”.  It is not clear whether a trumpet or shofar is to be blown on this day.  The ancient Jewish tradition, however, was to blow a shofar.

Meaning: This day is also known as the 'Day of the Awakening Blast.' with at least four meanings. 1) Tradition holds that loud blasts are connected to this day when the Messiah will be crowned King over all the earth (Num 23:21); 2) when the people of the earth hear the sound of the shofar they are to repent of their sins, and 3) the resurrection of the dead at the return of the King, and 4) a battle cry of the King's vengeance which that rehearses the coming of the "Day of the Lord." The Jews also call Trumpets the “Day of Judgment”.

5. Atonement | Yom Kippur

In Hebrew yom means "day" and kippur is from a root meaning "to atone". On this day the Great Shofar (the Shofar haGadol) is blown to signify the “Day of Judgment”—another name for Yom Kippur.

Meaning: The general  meaning of this appointed day of [Yom Kippur] is a generally similar to those in both the Jewish and Christian faiths: it is a day of fasting, repentance, and acknowledgment of the covering sacrifice of Jesus the Christ (Yeshua HaMashiach) for sin. It is commonly understood that the Messiah is the first goat. It is not so commonly understood that He is the second goat that is set forth to go into the wilderness—into the world—to fulfill His purpose in two comings.  Some recognize this understanding in Hebrew Roots, some do not. The Feast Days are all about the Messiah and His Plan of Salvation for mankind.

6. Booths (Tabernacles) | Chag haSukkot (Sukkot)
 
Sukkot is a seven-day autumn harvest festival where believers are instructed to dwell in temporary dwellings (Lev 23). Although no specific harvest crop is noted in scripture, Jewish tradition associates wine and water with festivals at Temple rituals. The Hebrew word Sukkot is usually translated as "tabernacles," or "booths" and is the plural form of sukka (sue’-kah)— a Hebrew word meaning tent or (temporary)booth that one lived in–not the Tabernacle (which was used for worship and was the portable sanctuary in the wilderness). The sukka symbolizes man's need to depend upon God for food, water, and shelter.  Other translations translate the word more closely to its intended meaning of a tent or booth; hence the name “Feast of Booths”. “This feast is also known by other names, such as, the Festival of Ingathering (Ex. 23:16), the Feast of the Nations, the Festival of Dedication, the Festival of Lights, and the Season of Our Joy.

Meaning: Anciently the feast represented the wandering in the wilderness and the physical harvest.  For the believer, today, Sukkot has additional manifold spiritual meanings: it is the church’s journey;  the harvest of souls at the end of the age (Olam Hazeh=”this world”) (Matt13:39; Rev.14:15; Joel 3:13), while the 7 days and the Feast being the 7th appointment also foreshadow the millennial reign of Christ in the 7,000th year with His Bride. These seven days especially represent a time to place the cares of our life aside for a time, to fellowship, to learn, to recreate, and, perhaps have the opportunity to  travel to beautiful areas of the nation where more than 110 festival locations (including Church of God) are located and share in meaning of the festival.  It has a far deeper meaning and expression than Christmas. The last day of the feast is known as Hoshana Rabbah.

7. Eighth Day | Shemini Atzeret

The Hebrew word means "Eighth [day of] Assembly" and immediately follows the Feast of Sukkot. Hebrew Roots adherents view this day in a different light than those in the Jewish faith in which the day is “characterized as a day when the Jewish people "tarries" to spend an additional day with God at the end of Sukkot”.

Meaning: There is no direct Scriptural indication for what the day means; however, clues may be determined in the use of the number 8 in scripture. The number 8 is widely accepted as meaning “a new beginning”.  It is prophetic of the time after the 7000 year millennium when the White Throne Judgment is held.  A new beginning, termed the “World to Come” (Olam Haba in Hebrew) will occur with the establishment of a new Heavens, new Earth, and a new Jerusalem as described in Revelation 22.

Messianics and some in Hebrew Roots combine this appointment with the Feast of Sukkot and, therefore, do not recognize it as the special day that it is made to be.

Christology
There is no unified Christology in the Hebrew Roots movement. The vast majority believe that Yeshua is God in the flesh. However, there are those who don't, stating that the "notion of a "Trinity" or any other "God in the flesh" Messiah teaching is a fundamental violation of that clear understanding of the ONE and ONLY true God".

Other beliefs
Hebrew Roots teachers emphasize the adoption of all Christians into the faith of Abraham, often referred to in the Bible as the unified "House of Israel",,,,. This unified "House of Israel" consists of Jews and Non-Jews who maintain faith in the Messiah and a Spirit-led adherence to the Torah, God's teaching and instruction, as a lifestyle of faith and love.
Hebrew Roots followers believe that Christians have the "testimony of Jesus," but are often found innocently to be keeping fewer commandments than they are intended to  according to the erroneous idea that Yeshua died to do away with the Torah, thus abolishing it and any requirements to "guard" or "keep" it, which is contrary to scripture.

The Hebrew Roots movement emphasizes the completion of the unified "House of Israel" in Yeshua, which includes both Jews and non-Jews. Its followers believe that they are co-heirs and equal members of the chosen people of the God of Israel through the blood of Messiah, and that returning to a 1st-century mindset provides deeper and more authentic insights into the Hebrew idioms of the New Testament (which are often garbled after their translation to Greek), which provides deeper cultural understanding of scripture. Also of importance is a greater understanding of the dispersion of tribes of Israel, and the future regathering of those tribes according to prophecies of scripture.

Some Hebraic Roots congregations encourage the use of Hebrew-based forms of the sacred names, but this is generally a minor emphasis.

Christian Hebrew Roots movement
The Hebrew Roots movement is related to a subgroup known as "Christian Hebrew Roots." This subgroup follows the Ten Commandments (Ex 20:3–17) and the feasts of the Lord (Lev 23:1–44), but like mainstream Christianity it believes that all other Old Testament requirements have been "done away with".

The Christian Hebrew Roots movement rejects many of the same practices of many Protestant sects that the Hebrew Roots movement rejects. In particular, they reject the Roman Catholic Church's "transubstantiation" doctrine, and instead follow what it sees as the biblical teachings set forth in the New Testament regarding the "nature of Communion" as a symbol of Christ's body instead of the literal body and flesh of Jesus. This, they deduce from the words Jesus spoke to describe what they call an "amendment" to the Passover service being symbolic and not literal (in accordance with how they interpret the New Testament Greek).

The Christian Hebrew Roots movement does not teach a return to the law as dispensed by the scribes who Jesus rebuked as hypocrites. They interpret the "law" as pertaining to the Torah, and not the Jewish Oral Law. The movement follows what it claims is the worship pattern of Jesus, whom they claim freed mankind from the yoke of the letter of the law; and, in fulfilling the law, Jesus taught Christians to practice only the Ten Commandments and feasts of the Lord which make up "the acceptable year of the Lord" in his speech inaugurating his personal earthly ministry.

This main distinction between the two groups is that followers of the Hebrew Roots movement understand the word "fulfill" (playroo G4137), found in Matthew 5:17, to mean "fill up" specifically with meaning. This is in contradistinction to "destroy" (kataluo G2647) with which it is contrasted earlier in the same verse. Fulfill is also found to mean to place the commandments of God "on a firmer footing by interpreting them correctly in terms of God's ultimate will as He originally intended for His commandments to be obeyed", and not dispensing with them as something that has been "done away" by the atoning work of Jesus Christ, as Christian Hebrew Roots followers define it.

Both movements include adherents who are of Jewish heritage as well as Gentile heritage. The Christian Hebrew Roots movement is completely nondenominational, consisting of persons from many different religious backgrounds and teaches adherence to the health laws of the Torah but not the portions of the Torah which it believes were abandoned by Jesus. As such, they function as a sort of "bridge" between true Hebrew Roots theology and mainstream Christianity.

Criticism

The Hebrew Roots movement, similar to the Messianic movement, has been accused by some in the Jewish community of cultural appropriation.

See also
 Christian Torah-submission
 Christian views on the Old Covenant
 Early Christianity
 Ebionites
 Judaizers
 Nazarene (sect)
 New Perspective on Paul
 Paleo-orthodoxy
 Restorationism

References

External links
 Pam Dewey, Hebrew Roots Movement (Field Guide to the Wild World of Religion)

Christianity and Judaism
Christianity in the United States
Sacred Name Movement